Hu Haifeng (born November 1972) is a Chinese politician and the son of Hu Jintao, former General Secretary of the Chinese Communist Party (CCP) and Paramount leader of China. He is currently the CCP Committee Secretary of Lishui, Zhejiang, and previously the deputy CCP Committee Secretary and mayor of Jiaxing.

Life and career
Hu graduated with a degree in Computer Science from Beijing Jiaotong University and Executive MBA from the School of Economics and Management at Tsinghua University. Hu married fellow Tsinghua graduate Wang Jun, who is now assistant at School of Economics and Management at Tsinghua. Hu Haifeng was the chairman of Nuctech, a Tsinghua University-owned company created in the late 1990s to make large scanners for shipping, trucking containers and railway cars, as well as luggage scanners and metal detectors for airports.After Hu became chairman of the company, it was granted a near-monopoly by the central authorities on the lucrative market for selling security equipment to airports in China. In 2009, the company had roughly 90% of the domestic market. Chinese investment in airport security has risen sharply after the September 11 attacks.In 2008, Hu Haifeng was promoted to Communist Party secretary of Tsinghua Holdings, which controls Nuctech and more than 20 other companies. In July 2009, the Namibian government charged Nuctech with corruption. The company has been the focus for repeated allegations of unfair competition in the European Union, and also for corruption and abuse of office in the Philippines. In South Africa, investigations of corruption are underway regarding a contract obtained by the company for the sale of scanners amounting to 380 million Rand (US$54 million).

Sources
Wall Street Journal Asia ("Firm of Hu's son gets scanner pact at China airports" December 13)

References

Businesspeople from Gansu
Living people
Hu Jintao family
Children of national leaders of China
1972 births
Tsinghua University alumni
People's Republic of China politicians from Gansu
Mayors of places in China
Chinese Communist Party politicians from Gansu